The effects of Hurricane Dean in the Greater Antilles were spread over six countries and included 20 deaths. Hurricane Dean formed in the Atlantic Ocean west of Cape Verde on August 14 as part of the 2007 Atlantic hurricane season. The Cape Verde-type hurricane tracked steadily westward into the Caribbean, where it rapidly intensified. Its outer bands swept over the Greater Antilles; the storm surge was felt from the eastern side of Puerto Rico to the western tip of Cuba. It brushed the island of Jamaica as a Category 4 hurricane on the Saffir-Simpson Hurricane Scale before striking Mexico's Yucatán Peninsula at Category 5 strength.

National governments, domestic non-governmental organizations, and international aid agencies established hundreds of shelters, evacuated hundreds of thousands of people, raised millions of dollars of resources, and rallied thousands of rescue workers as the powerful hurricane churned through the Caribbean. Despite a number of near misses, Hurricane Dean did not make landfall in the Greater Antilles and the islands were spared the brunt of the storm.

Six people were killed in the Dominican Republic and another fourteen in Haiti. Three were killed in Jamaica, which also suffered US$310 million of damage—the heaviest in the Caribbean. The most severe damage there was to the agricultural sector; nearly the entire banana crop was destroyed. Global aid organizations contributed to the subsequent recovery effort; immediate life-saving needs were met within days, but the damage to Jamaica's infrastructure and economy took much longer to repair. With loans and grants from the local government, the European Union, and the United Nations, normality was restored by the following summer.

Preparations

Hispaniola
A tropical storm watch was issued for the south coast of the Dominican Republic on August 17 at 0300 UTC. Later that day the tropical storm watch was upgraded to a tropical storm warning. Additionally, a hurricane watch was issued from Cabo Beata to the Haitian border. This was further upgraded that night with a hurricane warning from Barahona to the Haitian border. Workers from World Vision, already on the island for unrelated humanitarian work, pre-positioned food, clean water, medicines and emergency generators in the southern provinces where hurricane warnings had been issued. As the storm approached, 1,580 of the island's most vulnerable residents were evacuated to shelters.

A tropical storm watch was issued at 0900 UTC for the southwestern peninsula of Haiti from Port-au-Prince to the Dominican border. This advisory was upgraded the next morning to a tropical storm warning and a hurricane watch, and that night was further upgraded to a hurricane warning. The Haitian coastal authority advised all small craft to stay in port, while at Port-au-Prince, all flights to southern Haiti from Toussaint Louverture International Airport were canceled. More than 1,000 people were evacuated from low-lying areas and workers from World Vision again pre-positioned relief supplies.

Jamaica
On August 17, when a hurricane watch was issued for Jamaica, Prime Minister of Jamaica Portia Simpson-Miller convened an emergency meeting of Jamaica's national disaster preparedness council. Political parties in the island suspended their campaigning for the August 27 national elections to allow residents to prepare for the storm. The Caribbean Disaster Emergency Response Agency (CDERA), which was already responding to Hurricane Dean's impact in the Lesser Antilles, contacted the Jamaican Office of Disaster Preparedness and Emergency Management to confirm technical and logistics support, and to notify the Jamaican government that utilities teams had been placed on standby should they be needed. The North-West Caribbean Donor Group also met to consider what action might it might undertake in Dean's aftermath.

On August 18 the hurricane watch was upgraded to a hurricane warning. Curfews were put in place for parts of the island, while off-duty essential personnel were called back to work. The United States confirmed that it would offer aid if it was needed. Only one member of a United Nations Disaster Assessment and Coordination team arrived in Jamaica before all incoming flights were canceled.

More than 1,000 schools and churches were converted to emergency shelters, but residents only occupied 47 of them before the storm's arrival. The country's high crime rate led islanders to fear for their belongings should they abandon their homes. UNICEF prepared 4 emergency health kits and 1,000 water containers and Copa Airlines agreed to fly the supplies to Jamaica on its scheduled August 22 flight, if possible. The World Food Program prepared food stock in nearby Haiti, ready to move them to Jamaica if they were needed, although damage to their airport ultimately prevented their distribution.

Other islands

At 2100 UTC August 16, 2007 a tropical storm watch was issued for Puerto Rico. At 0300 UTC August 17 this advisory was upgraded to a tropical storm warning. The U.S. Federal Emergency Management Agency, eager to make a good showing after its heavily criticized response to Hurricane Katrina, deployed a Federal Incident Response Support Team to the unincorporated territory of the United States ahead of Hurricane Dean. This five-member team of disaster management experts was equipped with satellite communication systems to provide video-teleconferencing and help make real-time assessments of any damage.

On August 17 a tropical storm watch was issued for Cuba between the provinces of Camagüey and Guantánamo. This was upgraded on the afternoon of August 18 to a tropical storm warning. At 0300 UTC August 19 a tropical storm watch was issued for portions of central Cuba: Ciego de Ávila, Sancti Spíritus, Cienfuegos, Matanzas, and Isla de la Juventud. More than 350,000 people were evacuated by the Civil Defense in the coastal provinces, and the government in Havana suspended all tourist programs ahead of the storm.

At 1500 UTC on August 18 a hurricane watch was issued for the Cayman Islands and the Emergency Operations Centre was activated. Twelve hours later, as Hurricane Dean continued to track west towards the islands, the hurricane watch was upgraded to a hurricane warning. Major airlines added flights leaving the islands for tourists to evacuate. Tourists were barred from entering the islands starting August 17.
A mandatory evacuation order was imposed on the island of Little Cayman by Governor of the Cayman Islands Stuart Jack, and extra flights were initiated between Little Cayman and Cayman Brac. On August 19, nineteen schools and civic centers were converted to shelters: fifteen on Grand Cayman, three on Cayman Brac, and, despite the mandatory evacuation order in effect, one on Little Cayman. Two Royal Navy ships of the Atlantic Patrol Task (North),  and RFA Wave Ruler, followed  behind the storm in order to arrive at Cayman as soon after the hurricane as possible.

Impact
Hurricane Dean passed just south of the Greater Antilles from August 17 to August 21. Having entered the Caribbean Sea as a Category 2 storm, it quickly strengthened to a Category 5 hurricane near Puerto Rico before weakening slightly to Category 4 strength as it swept under the rest of the Greater Antilles. Strengthening again as it passed the islands, Dean regained Category 5 strength off the eastern tip of Cuba before making landfall in Mexico. The storm's winds, rains, and storm surge endangered life and property throughout the island chain.

Hispaniola
The moderate winds and heavy rains did not damage the agriculture sector as they did elsewhere in the Caribbean. Six deaths were attributed to the effects of the hurricane. The strong wave activity on the southern coastline attracted a crowd of onlookers and a 16-year-old boy was swept out to sea and drowned as he watched  swells break over a road in Santo Domingo. Also, five fishermen drowned in the northern Santiago province after their boat capsized due to the effect of wind and torrential rain in the Tavera Dam, near the town of Baitoa. The victims were fishing along with three others that managed to swim ashore, and were believed to have ignored warnings issued by civil defense authorities. Rough surf destroyed at least 5 houses along the southern coast and damaged 316.

The outer fringes of Hurricane Dean swept over Haiti bringing heavy squalls. On Gonâve Island, thousands of people lost power and some took shelter in schools and churches. The roof of the Hopital St. Michel in Jacmel, damaged before the storm, leaked significantly leading to water damage in the operating room. Two people were killed in Tiburon and Moron, towns in the south and southeast of the island, respectively. Seven other storm-related deaths were confirmed but few details were given. Another four were injured in a sailboat after disregarding warnings to stay in port. Several hundred homes were destroyed due to the resulting landslides. In the department of Sud-Est, Nippes, Centre, and Artibonite, 5,154 people retreated to temporary shelters. Hurricanes typically pose significant hazards to potable water in Haiti, but Hurricane Dean produced only a modest  of rainfall. As such, the storm caused no major problems with water and sanitation, except in the town of Bainet, where the temperamental water system was compromised.

Jamaica

In Jamaica, flooding was reported on the east of the island, and mudslides occurred on the northeast coast. In Kingston, buildings collapsed and houses had their roofing torn off by the strong winds, which felled trees and lampposts. A shoot-out between police and looters occurred in the parish of Clarendon. Over 1,500 roofs were lost, primarily to the hurricane-force winds. 3,127 houses were heavily damaged, 1,582 of which were left totally uninhabitable. Two-thirds of the homes in the southeastern parishes of Clarendon, St. Catherine, and Kingston/St. Andrew sustained significant damages. One man was killed in Clarendon by a collapsing roof, and a 14-year-old girl in Whitehorses, St. Thomas was killed by rock damage to her home. A third Jamaican was killed when he was struck by flying debris during the height of the storm.

Hurricane Dean affected 248 roads: 10 were blocked in the Kingston metropolitan region, 14 sections were blocked in St. Andrew, 43 were blocked in St. Catherine, 8 were blocked in the Western Region (Saint James, Hanover, Westmoreland, and Trelawny), and 110 were blocked in the Northeast region. Furthermore, the road from Kingston to the airport was covered in sand, boulders, and downed power lines.

Agriculture damage was widespread. Across the country 40% of the sugarcane crop, 80–100% of the banana crop, 75% of the coffee trees under three years old, and 20% of the top layer of the cocoa crop were lost to the storm. Insured damage in Jamaica was initially estimated at US$1.5 billion, but post-storm analysis showed that it was closer to US$310 million.

Elsewhere
Rain from Hurricane Dean closed several roads throughout Puerto Rico and there was heavy surf along the island's coast, but no deaths or injuries were reported. The hurricane's outer bands swept over Cuba between August 19 and August 21, bringing heavy rain and high seas, but sparing the island its damaging winds. In the Cayman Islands, rain flooded roads and there were high waves along the coast, but no deaths or serious injuries were reported. There were localized power outages and the water supply was shut off briefly, but the rest of the island's infrastructure was unaffected. Approximately 2,000 people weathered the storm in temporary shelters.

Aftermath
Despite the storm's powerful intensity, Hurricane Dean's damage was moderate. It did not have severe or lasting effects on infrastructure, and the non-agricultural sectors of economies throughout the Greater Antilles recovered quickly.

Haiti
On August 23 the Haitian government sent food, sachets of potable water, mattresses, and medicines to the town of Bainet in the Sud-Est department. On August 24 the Pan American Development Foundation sent food to all people living in temporary shelters and Venezuela delivered 11 tonnes of emergency food to Sud-Est in 500 family bags. Hurricane assistance was then compounded by the country's standard humanitarian assistance programs and became indistinct from the country's continued poverty crisis.

Jamaica

The World Food Program immediately placed 5,500 Jamaicans on complementary food assistance, a daily ration of 1900 kJ (450 kcal) of High Energy Biscuits, for two weeks. On August 22, three days after the hurricane struck the island, the United States Agency for International Development (USAID) sent US$398,000 of emergency supplies to Jamaica's Norman Manley International Airport. These supplies included mattresses, blankets, plastic sheeting, hygiene kits and water containers. The Inter-American Development Bank (IDB) provided a US$200,000 grant to support the relief effort. The Chinese Red Cross, despite dealing with Typhoon Sepat, sent US$30,000 to its Jamaican counterpart for the purchase of emergency relief supplies.

On August 24 Jamaican Prime Minister Portia Simpson Miller announced that her government would provide JA$225 million in emergency assistance to the country's agriculture sector, especially the parishes of Portland, Clarendon, St. Thomas, Manchester, St. Catherine and St. Elizabeth. JA$100 million was immediately allocated to the purchase of fertilizers, JA$25 million to the Blue Mountain coffee farmers, and the Agriculture Ministry's JA$50 million fruit tree programme was accelerated. She also announced that the National Housing Trust had established a JA$500 million programme to provide loans at 6% per annum for emergency repairs. The National Housing Trust also made JA$200 million available to the Hurricane Relief Fund. The government provided tarpaulins, 10,000 of which were shipped in after the storm, free of charge to patch houses with damaged roofs.

The Jamaican general election scheduled for August 27 was postponed until September 3, at which point they went ahead as planned. Opponents accused Prime Minister Portia Simpson-Miller of unnecessarily extending the state of emergency (and related curfews) to maintain her political control as predictions at the time suggested that she and her party would be ousted by the opposition. She and her party ultimately did lose the election, although Dean's light damage was not thought to have been a major factor.

By the end of the summer of 2008, banana production in Jamaica was returning to pre-Dean levels. With the help of JA$1.1 billion of aid from the EU's Banana Support Programme, thousands of acres were replanted. Banana chips were the first products ready for export at the beginning of the summer, with fresh banana production following shortly thereafter as the agricultural industry returned to normal.

See also

 List of Atlantic hurricanes
 List of Category 5 Atlantic hurricanes
 2007 Atlantic hurricane season
 Hurricane Dean
 Greater Antilles
 Geography of the Greater Antilles

References

External links
The NHC's archive on Hurricane Dean

Hurricane Dean
2007 in the Caribbean
Dean
Dean Greater Antilles